Vicente Muñoz Puelles (born 1948) is a Spanish author and translator. He has published over 240 books, including over 180 for children and young adults, as well as almost 500 articles on literary criticism and fiction.

Life and work
Muñoz Puelles is the nephew of Spanish film director, screenwriter and producer, Ricardo Muñoz Suay.

Prior to his writing career, he taught biological sciences at the University of Valencia. From 1999 to 2018, he was a member of the Valencian Council of Culture.

One of Muñoz Puelles' novels, Parallel Shadows, was made into a movie in 1995. His works have been translated into many languages, and 22 of his books can be found in the United States Library of Congress.

Prizes 

 1980: Premio La Sonrisa Vertical De Narrativa Erótica
 1982: Premio De La Crítica De La Comunidad Valenciana De Novela
 1984: Premio Ciudad De Valencia De Novela
 1986: Premio De La Crítica De La Comunidad Valenciana De Novela
 1987: Premio Ciudad De Valencia De Novela
 1994: Prix Littéraire Ascension Pour La Lecture
 1993: Premio Azorín
 1998: Premio Vila De Mislata De Narrativa Corta
1999: Premio Nacional De Literatura Infantil Y Juvenil
2000: Premi De Teatre Eduard Escalante Dels Premis Literaris Ciutat De València
 2001: Premio Ciutat De València De Teatro
 2002: Premio Ciudad De Alicante De Álbum Infantil Ilustrado
 2002: Premio Alfons El Magnànim “Valencia” De Narrativa En Castellano
 2004: Premio Alandar De Literatura Juvenil
 2004: Premio Anaya De Narrativa Infantil Y Juvenil
 2005: Premio Libreros De Asturias
2011: Banco del Libro de Venezuela
 2014: Premio Anaya En Su Edición XI, De Literatura Infantil Y Juvenil
 2018: Premio De Las Letras De Generalitat Valenciana

Publications

Novels 

 Anacaona, 1980
 Amor Burgués, 1982
 Campos De Marte, 1985
 Tierra De Humo, 1986
 La Noche De Los Tiempos, 1987
 Sombras Paralelas, 1989
 Las Ruinas De Nínive, 1990
 El Último Manuscrito De Hernando Colón, 1992
 Tierra De Humo, 1992
 Huellas En La Nieve, 1993
 La Ciudad En Llamas, 1993
 La Emperatriz Eugenia En Zululandia, 1994
Amantes Artificiales, 1995
La Curvatura Del Empeine, 1996
 El Último Capricho De Francisco Goya, 1997
 El Cráneo De Goya, 1997
 El Caballo Rojo, 1999
El Piloto Y El Arca, 2001
 La Ciudad De Los Murciélagos, 2001
 El Tajo De Roldán, 2001
 Los Amantes De La Niebla, 2002
 Manzanas (Tratado De Pomofilia), 2002
 Las Desventuras De Un Escritor En Provincias, 2003
 El Último Deseo Del Jíbaro Y Otras Fantasmagorías, 2003
 El Cráneo De Goya, 2004
 El Legado De Hipatia, 2007
 2083, 2008 (in Catalan), 2009 (in Valencian), 2010 (in Spanish)

Young adult fiction 

 El Tigre De Tasmania, 1988 (translated into Valencian in 1999)
Yo, Colón, Descubridor Del Paraíso Terrenal, Almirante De La Mar Océana, Virrey Y Gobernador De Las Indias, 1991
 Yo, Goya, Primer Pintor De La Corte Española, Defensor De La Libertad, Grabador De Sueños Y Caprichos, 1992
 La Isla De Las Sombras Perdidas, 1998
 Las Hadas, 1998
El Lleopard De Les Neus, 2001
 La Foto De Portobello, 2004
Portobelloko Argazkia (in Basque), 2005
 ¡Polizón A Bordo! (El Secreto De Colón), 2005
 El Pintor De Las Neuronas (Ramón Y Cajal. Científico), 2006
 El Viaje De La Evolución (El Joven Darwin), 2007
 El Vuelo De La Razón (Goya, Pintor De La Libertad), 2007
El ayudante de Darwin, 2009
 La Guerra De Amaya, 2010
 La Expedición De Los Libros, 2010 (in Spanish and Catalan)
 2083, 2010
 El Joven Gulliver, 2011
 El Regreso De Peter Pan, 2011
Antología Del Humor Español, 2012
 La Fábrica De Betún (El Joven Dickens), 2012
 Canción Para Otra Navidad, 2012
 El Rayo Azul, 2014
Cuentos y leyendas del Mar, 2014
Fantasmas Y Aparecidos. Antología De Relatos Españoles De Misterio, 2014
La Voz Del Árbol, 2014
 La Velocidad De La Luz, 2015
 El Misterio Del Cisne, 2016
Cuentos y leyendas de la Tierra, 2016
 El Despertar De Cervantes, 2016 
 La Amada Inmortal, 2017
Cuentos Y Leyendas De Las Matemáticas, 2017
 El Último Manuscrito De Blasco Ibáñez, 2017
 La Isla De Los Libros Andantes, 2018
La Niña el Clima
Sherlock Holmes Y Yo, 2021

Translations and adaptations 

 Ilíada. Odisea. Eneida, 2015
 Don Quijote de la Mancha, 2015
Escalofríos. Relatos Clásicos Del Más Allá, 2015
 Don Álvaro O La Fuerza Del Sino, 2020

Adaptations for young adults and children 

 Diario De A Bordo, by Cristóbal Colón, 1984
 Juventud Y La Línea De Sombra, by Joseph Conrad, 1989
 Naufragios Y Comentarios, by Cabeza De Vaca, 1992
 El Último Mohicano, by James Fenimore Cooper, 1996
 Las Aventuras De Sherlock Holmes, by Arthur Conan Doyle, 2001
 El Hombre Invisible, by H. G. Wells, 2002
 Moonfleet, by John Meade Falkner, 2002
 El Forastero Misterioso, by Mark Twain, 2002
 Un Libro Maravilloso, by Nathaniel Hawthorne, 2002
 El Sabueso De Los Baskerville, by Arthur Conan Doyle, 2002
 Juventud Y La Línea De Sombra, by Joseph Conrad, 2003
 Miguel Strogoff, by Jules Verne, 2004
 El Último Saludo De Sherlock Holmes, by Arthur Conan Doyle, 2004
 Don Quijote Para Niños, 2004
 La Biblia Para Niños, 2005
 El Archivo De Sherlock Holmes, by Arthur Conan Doyle, 2005
 La Esfinge De Los Hielos, by Jules Verne, 2005
 Don Quijote De La Mancha, 2005
 El Cantar De Mío Cid, 2006
 Las Memorias De Sherlock Holmes, by Arthur Conan Doyle, 2007
 El Regreso De Sherlock Holmes, by Arthur Conan Doyle, 2008
 Catriona, by Robert Louis Stevenson, 2009
 Historias De Dragones, by E. Nesbit, 2009
 La Dama De Las Camelias, by Alexandre Dumas, 2009
 Cuentos Españoles De Terror, by Various Authors, 2010
 La Vida De Lazarillo De Tormes, 2010
 Leyendas De Mío Cid, 2010
 Novelas Ejemplares, by Miguel De Cervantes, 2010
 Leyendas, by Gustavo Adolfo Bécquer, 2010
 La Invención Del Fantasma. Introducción Y Apéndice De El Fantasma De La Ópera, by Gaston Leroux, 2011
 Regreso A Croydon. Introducción Y Apéndice De Oliver Twist, by Charles Dickens, 2011
 Cuentos De Fantasmas, by Various Authors, 2011
 Cuentos Policiacos, Various Authors, 2011
 Cuentos De Humor Español, Various Authors, 2012
 Cuentos De Vampiros, Various Authors, 2012
 El Deseo De Ser Leído. Apéndice De Fábulas, by Samaniego, 2012
 Una Vida Prestada. Apéndice De Cuentos De Lo Sobrenatural, by Charles Dickens, 2012
 La Celestina, De Fernando De Rojas, 2016
Cuentos De Fantasmas, 2017
Mi Primera Biblia, 2017
 Drácula, by Bram Stoker, 2017 (Catalan translation also published in 2017)
 Metamorfosis, by Ovid, 2018

For children 

 Los Sueños De Axel, 1987
 La Constel·Lació Del Drac, 1987
 Óscar Y El León De Correos, 1998
 Laura Y El Ratón, 2000
Laura I El Ratolí (in Valencian), 2000
 Sombras De Manos, 2002
 Ricardo Y El Dinosaurio Rojo, 2003
 El Sueño Del Libro, 2004
 El Arca Y Yo, 2004
 La Sombra De Laura, 2005
L'ombra De Laura (in Valencian), 2005
L'ombra De Laura (in Catalan), 2005
A Sombra De Laura (in Galician)
La Luz Del Faro, 2005
 La Perrona, 2006
L'arca I Jo (in Valencian), 2006
 Niños De Todo El Mundo, 2006
Nens I Nenes De Tot El Món (in Catalan), 2006
Xiquets De Tot El Món (in Valencian), 2006
Nenas e nenos Do Mundo (in Galician), 2006
 Los Animales De La Ciudad, 2006
Os Animais Da Didade (in Galician), 2006
 La Rana Rony, 2007
La Granota Roc-I-Roc (in Catalan), 2007
 El Sueño De Peter, 2007
 Óscar Y El Río Amazonas, 2009
Òscar I El Riu Amazones (in Valencian), 2009
El Somni Del Ilibre, 2010 (in Catalan)
Els Animals De La Ciutat, 2006 (in Catalan)
 La Gata Que Aprendió A Escribir, 2012
Tu Primera Biblia, 2014
 La Torre De Babel, 2017
 Laura Y El Oso Polar, 2018
Ciudades Perdidas, 2019
Lazarillo de Tormes
Ricardo Y El Gato Con Motas, 2019
La Ciudad De Las Estatuas, 2020 
Mi Primer Libro Sobre Los Juegos Olímpicos, 2020
Un Recorrido Por Los Juegos Olímpicos, 2020
Mi Primer Libro Sobre Egipto, 2021
Egipto Y El Río Nilo, 2021
Óscar Y El Loro Del Mercado, 2021

Other selected works 

 Zona De Iliure Trànsit, collaboration with Josep Palomero, 2001
Berlanguiana, 2020

References 

1948 births
Living people
Spanish translators
20th-century Spanish male writers
21st-century Spanish male writers
20th-century Spanish novelists
21st-century Spanish novelists
Spanish male novelists
Spanish writers of young adult literature
People from Valencia
Academic staff of the University of Valencia